Fly High is the third album by Me & My, released in 2001.

Track listing
 Fly High (4:29)
 La La Superstar (3:24)
 Sleeping My Day Away (4:25)
 Can't Forget The Past (Da Dap) (4:21)
 Secret Garden (3:20)
 No Way (3:18)
 If I Was Your Lover (3:08)
 The Sweetest Melody (3:30)
 What Am I Gonna Do? (3:37)
 Take My Heart (3:41)
 Crazy (4:23)
 Fly High Goodbye (1:43)

Japanese Version

 Fly High
 Can't For Get The Past (Da Dap) (different mix)
 Sleeping My Day Away
 La La Superstar
 Secret Garden
 No Way
 If I Was Your Love
 Sweetest Melody
 What Am I Gonna Do
 Take My Heart
 Crazy
 Fly High Goodbye
 Fly High (Club Mix)
 Fly High (Dj Aligator  Club Mix)
 Fly High (Ringo Brothers Remix)

Me & My albums
2001 albums